The Battle of Bab el Oued was a violent confrontation which occurred during the latter stages of the Algerian War (1954–1962) between the French Army and the Organisation armée secrète (OAS) which opposed Algerian independence. It took place in Bab El Oued, a traditionally white working-class quarters of Algiers, from 23 March to 6 April 1962.

Context

The OAS uprising (19 March)

The OAS was an organization of hard-line European "Pieds Noirs" living in (the then-French territory) Algeria who were opposed to the cease-fire announced by French president Charles de Gaulle on 19 March 1962 between French forces and the Front de libération nationale (FLN) forces fighting for Algerian Independence. The OAS decided to dig in at their stronghold of Bab El Oued (a traditionally European working-class area) to fight the Evian Agreements by force.

Siege of Bab el Oued (from 23 March to 6 April)
The Battle of Bab el Oued was principally a battle between the French Gendarmerie Mobile and the OAS Commando Delta. The French government forces used M8 Greyhound armoured cars to control the exits to the town whilst suspicious buildings were surveilled from the air by T-6 and T-28 aircraft departing from Boufarik Air Base. Four T-6s strafed the roofs to clear them from snipers after Army helicopters dropped canisters with tear gas.
Most of the troops setting siege to the quarter had been ferried to Algeria by Surcouf and Maillé-Brézé, along with other three destroyers, on 2 March.

In support of Bab-el Oued, 200 OAS maquis marched from Algiers to Ouarsenis, a mountainous region between Oran and Algiers. They tried to capture two French military outposts and gain support from local Muslim tribes loyal to France, but instead these forces were harassed and eventually defeated by Legion units led by Colonel Albert Brothier after several days of fighting.

Arrest of General Jouhaud (25 March)
On 25 March 1962, General Edmond Jouhaud (adjutant to the commander of the OAS Raoul Salan and commander of the OAS-Oranie, the Oran branch of the OAS) was arrested at the Hôtel Panoramic d'Oran with his adjutant, Commander Julien Camelin.

1962 Isly massacre

The 1962 Isly massacre was an incident which occurred on 26 March 1962 in which a largely peaceful demonstration of anti-independence Pied-Noirs attempted to force their way through French Army roadblocks around the Great Post-Office of Algiers. The demonstrators encountered a roadblock manned by 45 soldiers from the 4th Tirailleur Regiment who fired on the crowd with machine guns. Between 50 and 80 Pied-Noirs demonstrators were killed in the massacre.

Casualties
According to the historian Benjamin Stora, 35 people were killed during the Battle of Bab el Oued and around 150 were wounded. Six French soldiers were killed by the OAS in a previous ambush.

References

External links
 Chillet, La Bataille de Bab-el-Oued, article from the journal Accent Grave n.14 April 1963
 Fusillade à Bab-el-Oued dirigée sur le 2e bataillon du 73e RIMa au poste de zouaves, ECPAD

1962 in Algeria
Airstrikes conducted by France
Algerian War
April 1962 events in Africa
Articles containing video clips
Battles involving France
Battles of the Algerian War
Conflicts in 1962
March 1962 events in Africa
Organisation armée secrète
Urban warfare